João Tiago Oliveira da Cunha (born 4 February 1996) is a Portuguese footballer who plays for Felgueiras, as a defender.

Football career
On 21 January 2015, Cunha made his professional debut with Rio Ave in a 2014–15 Taça da Liga match against Académica.

Personal
His father João Mário played 9 seasons in the Primeira Liga.

References

External links

1996 births
People from Valongo
Living people
Portuguese footballers
Association football defenders
Rio Ave F.C. players
F.C. Vizela players
S.C. Covilhã players
U.D. Leiria players
C.D. Mafra players
F.C. Felgueiras 1932 players
Liga Portugal 2 players
Campeonato de Portugal (league) players
Sportspeople from Porto District